"God's Great Banana Skin" is a song by British singer-songwriter Chris Rea, released in November 1992 as the second single from his 12th studio album God's Great Banana Skin (1992). The song was written and produced by Rea. "God's Great Banana Skin" reached  31 in the UK Singles Chart and remained on the chart for three weeks.

Background
Rea was inspired to write the song after he noticed his daughter was tempted to laugh at "somebody who'd been giving her a hard time". Rea told John Pidgeon in 1992: "I told her 'don't laugh when people go down even if they've been awful to you because you're tempting God to throw you a banana skin'. It's half moral and half superstition. Anybody who's done me a disservice in life, and I see them go down, you get tempted to laugh. I don't know whether it's superstition or not, or I daren't laugh just in case God throws me a banana skin as well."

Critical reception
Upon release, Robert Tilli of Music & Media wrote: "The tag line of the title track, sung in a dark threatening voice, is easy to sing along with, making it the ideal second single. The wailing harmonica in the background matches perfectly with the November rain and storms."

In a review of the album, Vlado Forgac of The Morning Star commented: "On the title track, Rea offers a humorous look at his own perception of faith." Lynn Saxberg of the Ottawa Citizen noted the "cryptic message" of the song and how it "addresses the superstitious idea that bad luck will come not only to those who think they're better than others, but also people who think they're inferior".

Track listings
7-inch and cassette single
 "God's Great Banana Skin" (remix) – 4:16
 "I Saw You Coming" – 4:30

CD single
 "God's Great Banana Skin" (remix) – 4:16
 "Just Passing Through" (live) – 6:09
 "Footprints in the Snow" (live) – 4:32
 "Winter Song" – 4:32

CD single (UK limited edition release)
 "God's Great Banana Skin" (remix) – 4:16
 "I Saw You Coming" – 4:30
 "She's Gonna Change Everything" – 4:46
 "You Must Be Evil" (live) – 4:47

Personnel
Production
 Chris Rea – production ("God's Great Banana Skin", "I Saw You Coming", "She's Gonna Change Everything")
 Neil Amor – engineering ("God's Great Banana Skin", "I Saw You Coming", "She's Gonna Change Everything")
 Targa Flurio – remixing ("God's Great Banana Skin")
 Jon Kelly – production ("Winter Song")

Other
 Chris Welch – banana illustration
 Stylorouge – artwork

Charts

References

1992 singles
1992 songs
Chris Rea songs
East West Records singles
Songs about luck
Songs written by Chris Rea